Asir Province was once a province of Saudi Arabia, which was located in the southwestern region of the country.

References

Provinces of Saudi Arabia